William Percy Osborne (4 November 1902 – 4 July 1984) was an Australian rules footballer who played with St Kilda in the Victorian Football League (VFL).

Osborne later played for Hawthorn and Prahran in the Victorian Football Association (VFA).

He was also prominent as a sailor, winning the Australian 14-foot championship on ten occasions.

Notes

External links 

Bill Osborne's playing statistics from The VFA Project

1902 births
1984 deaths
Australian rules footballers from Melbourne
St Kilda Football Club players
Hawthorn Football Club (VFA) players
Prahran Football Club players
Australian male sailors (sport)
People from St Kilda, Victoria
20th-century Australian people